The 2015–16 Northwestern Wildcats men's basketball team represented Northwestern University in the 2015–16 NCAA Division I men's basketball season. They were led by third year head coach Chris Collins. They were members of the Big Ten Conference and played their home games at Welsh-Ryan Arena. They finished the season 20–12, 8–10 in Big Ten play to finish in ninth place. They lost to Michigan in the second round of the Big Ten tournament.

Previous season
The Wildcats finished the 2014–15 Season 15–17, 6–12 in Big Ten play to finish in a tie for 10th place. They lost in the second round of the Big Ten tournament to Indiana.

Departures

Incoming transfers

Incoming recruits

Class of 2015 recruits

Class of 2016 recruits

Roster

Schedule and results
Source

|-
!colspan=9 style=| Exhibition

|-
!colspan=9 style=| Non-conference regular season

|-
!colspan=9 style=|Big Ten regular season

|-
!colspan=9 style=|Big Ten tournament

References

Northwestern Wildcats
Northwestern Wildcats men's basketball seasons
Northwestern Wild
Northwestern Wild